Lowell Bailey (born July 15, 1981 in Siler City, North Carolina) is an American biathlon coach and retired biathlete who competed from 2001 until 2018.

Career
His first World Cup podium was a 2nd place (following a disqualification) in the second sprint event at Kontiolahti (FIN) in 2014., and his first World Cup victory came in the 20 km event at the 2017 Biathlon World Championships  in Hochfilzen, Austria. He thus became the first biathlon world champion from the United States, as well as the oldest individual gold medalist at the World Championships in biathlon history, at 35 years and 216 days.

At the 2006 Winter Olympics, he finished 27th in the individual, 46th in the sprint, and 48th in the pursuit events.

At the 2010 Winter Olympics, he finished 36th in the 10 km sprint event and he also finished 36th in the 12.5 km pursuit.

He decided to retire at the end of 8th leg of 2017–18 Biathlon World Cup. In 2019 Bailey was appointed as the U.S. Biathlon Association's High Performance Director, working alongside former team-mate and Director of Athlete Development Tim Burke.

Results
All results are sourced from the International Biathlon Union.

Olympic Games

*The mixed relay was added as an event in 2014.

World Championships
1 medal (1 gold)

*During Olympic seasons competitions are only held for those events not included in the Olympic program.
**The mixed relay was added as an event in 2005.

Individual victories
1 victory (1 In)

*Results are from UIPMB and IBU races which include the Biathlon World Cup, Biathlon World Championships and the Winter Olympic Games.

References

External links
 
 
 
 
 

1981 births
Living people
People from Siler City, North Carolina
American male biathletes
Biathletes at the 2006 Winter Olympics
Biathletes at the 2010 Winter Olympics
Biathletes at the 2014 Winter Olympics
Biathletes at the 2018 Winter Olympics
Olympic biathletes of the United States
Biathlon World Championships medalists
University of Vermont alumni
Vermont Catamounts skiers
Cross-country skiing coaches
American sports coaches